Union of Iraqi Writers or officially The General Union for the Literaries and Writers in Iraq   is a nonprofit professional cultural NGO  that is concerned with Iraqi literary affairs. Founded in 1959 in Baghdad under Iraqi Republic (1958–68) and headquartered in Andalus Square in Baghdad and has branches in the provinces.

Establishment 
On 7 of May 1959, the first administrative body of Union elected by secret ballot; Jawahiri elected president by acclamation, and Salah Khalis as general secretary and members: Zul Nun Ayoub, Mohammed Saleh Bahr al-Ulum, Mahdi Makhzoumi and Abd al-Wahhab Al-Bayati, Ali Jawad al-Tahir (who became secretary general after the assignment of Dr. Khalis to work outside Iraq) and Lamia Abbas Amara and Yousef al-Ani and Saadi Yousef and Abdullah Goran and Abdul Malik Nuri and Abdul Majid al-Wendawi and Ali Jalil al-Wardi and the name of Abdul Hamid Hammoudi.

General Secretaries 
 1959 - 1980 : Muhammad Mahdi al-Jawahiri.
 1980 - 1986: Hamid Said Hadi.
 2003 - May 13, 2016: Alfred Semaan Al-Maqdisi.
 13 May 2016 - 28 August 2019: Ibrahim Al-Khayat.

References 

1959 establishments in Iraq
Organizations based in Baghdad
Professional associations based in Iraq
Non-profit organizations based in Iraq
Publishing companies of Iraq
Iraqi literature
Writers' organizations